Tiras ( Ṯīrās) is, according to the Book of Genesis and 1 Chronicles, the seventh and youngest son of Japheth in the Hebrew Bible. A brother of biblical Javan (associated with the Greek people), its geographical locale is sometimes associated by scholars with the Tershi or Tirsa, one of the groups which made up the Sea Peoples "thyrsenes" (Tyrrhenians), a naval confederacy which terrorized Egypt and other Mediterranean nations around 1200 BCE. These Sea People are referred to as "Tursha" in an inscription of Ramesses III, and as "Teresh of the Sea" on the Merneptah Stele.

Some theologians associate Tiras with Thrace or the Etruscans. In 1838, the German theologian Johann Christian Friedrich Tuch suggested identifying Tiras with the Etruscans — who, according to Greek and Roman sources such as Herodotus (I, 94), had been living in Lydia as the Tyrsenoi before emigrating to Italy as early as the 8th century BC.

Ancient and Medieval Identifications

According to the Book of Jubilees, the inheritance of Tiras consisted of four large islands in the ocean.

Josephus wrote that Tiras became ancestor of the "Thirasians" (Thracians) — a "flame-haired" (red or blond haired) people according to Xenophanes (Antiquities of the Jews, I, 6).

Movses Khorenatsi, 5th century Armenian historian, attributed the founder of Armenian nation, Hayk, to being a grandson of Tiras.
According to tractate Yoma, in the Talmud, Tiras is the ancestor of Persia. 

The Persian historian Muhammad ibn Jarir al-Tabari (c. 915) recounts a tradition that Tiras had a son named Batawil, whose daughters Qarnabil, Bakht, and Arsal became the wives of Cush, Put, and Canaan, respectively.

The mediaeval Hebrew compilation, the Chronicles of Jerahmeel, aside from quoting Yosippon as above, also provides a separate tradition of Tiras' sons elsewhere, naming them as Maakh, Tabel, Bal’anah, Shampla, Meah, and Elash. This material was ultimately derived from Pseudo-Philo (ca. 75 AD), extant copies of which list Tiras' sons as Maac, Tabel, Ballana, Samplameac, and Elaz.

Another medieval rabbinic text Book of Jasher (7:9) records the sons of Tiras as Benib, Gera, Lupirion, and Gilak, and in 10:14, it asserts that Rushash, Cushni, and Ongolis are among his descendants. An earlier (950 AD) rabbinic compilation, the Yosippon, similarly claims Tiras' descendants to be the Rossi of Kiv, i.e. Kievan Rus, listing them together with his brother Meshech's supposed descendants as "the Rossi; the Saqsni and the Iglesusi".

Modern interpretations 
English theologian John Gill (1697-1771) claimed Tiras was more aptly described as the founder of Thrace than Persia, stating that "[Tiras is interpreted] better the Targums of Jonathan and Jerusalem, and so a Jewish chronologer, by Thracia; for the descendants of Thiras, as Josephus observes, the Greeks call Thracians; and in Thrace was a river called Athyras, which has in it a trace of this man's name; and Odrysus, whom the Thracians worshipped, is the same with Tiras, which god sometimes goes by the name of Thrax; and is one of the names of Mars, the god of the Thracians.".

According to some biblical commentators, the descendants of Tiras have been identified with the Tyrsenoi, "who raided throughout the Aegean sea"; and to the Tursha (Turusha or Teresh), who were recorded by Egyptian sources at the time of pharaons Merneptah and Ramses II. Biblical commentators also propose a possible connection with the city of Troy, known in the Hittite language as Taruisa. 

Others (including Daniel G. Brinton) have suggested Tiras is the progenitor of the indigenous peoples of the Americas.

Notes

Book of Genesis people
Books of Chronicles people
Hebrew Bible nations
Japheth
Noach (parashah)
Thrace
Etruscans
Book of Jubilees